Pinus maximinoi, commonly known as thinleaf pine, is a species of conifer in the family Pinaceae.

References

External links
 
 

maximinoi
Least concern plants
Taxonomy articles created by Polbot
Flora of the Sierra Madre Occidental
Flora of the Central American pine–oak forests
Flora of Mexico
Flora of Central America